Arthur County is a county located in the U.S. state of Nebraska. As of the 2020 United States Census, the population was 434, making it Nebraska's third least populous county and the seventh-least populous county in the United States (behind only Loving County, Texas; Kalawao County, Hawaii; King County, Texas; Kenedy County, Texas; McPherson County, Nebraska; and Blaine County, Nebraska). Its county seat and only incorporated community is Arthur.

In the Nebraska license plate system, Arthur County is represented by the prefix 91 (it had the 91st-largest number of vehicles registered in the state when the license plate system was established in 1922).

Arthur County contains the historic First Arthur County Courthouse and Jail, believed to be the smallest courthouse in the United States.

History
Arthur County was established in 1913 from the western part of McPherson County following an effort to move the McPherson County seat from Tryon to the more centrally located Flats: rather than lose the county seat, the residents of Tryon, Nebraska agreed to have the county divided approximately in half, according to boundaries for sandhills counties originally proposed in 1887. The half which became Arthur County had been in the process of settlement by 1884, by ranchers seeking open grazing land. The placement of a post office at Lena in 1894 and the passage of the homesteading act in 1904 (which allowed claims of 640 acres compared to the previous 160 acres in this area) further influenced the county's founding and expedited the new county's establishment processes.

The new county was named after President Chester A. Arthur, and the village of Arthur, similarly named, was established to serve as the county seat. Principal postal service moved from Lena to the village of Arthur in 1914, which also held the county's public schools, general store, bank and co-op, principal churches, newspaper and other businesses and services, all aimed at continuing and facilitating the county's rural lifestyle.

The 1920 United States Census counted 1,412 residents in Arthur County, which was then and has remained entirely rural, essentially ranching. Although the village of Arthur underwent electrification in the 1920s, most of the county did not see power or telephone services until 1950–1951. At that time also, highway construction and improvements facilitated transportation, which was especially dependent upon the north-south State Highway 61 and the east-west Highway 92: motor vehicles were the sole means of mechanical transportation throughout Arthur's history as it had no railroad or canal. Irrigation of the sandhills land started by 1900 and continued through the first half of the twentieth century, with center-pivot irrigation dominating. The population peaked around 1930 at 1,344 persons, but declined with the Great Depression. By 1950, the county population was down to 803, by 1980 down to 513.

Geography

Major highways
  Nebraska Highway 61
  Nebraska Highway 92

Adjacent counties
 Grant County - north
 Hooker County - northeast
 McPherson County - east
 Keith County - south
 Garden County - west

Demographics

As of the 2000 United States Census, of 2000, there were 444 people, 185 households, and 138 families residing in the county. The population density was 0.618 people per square mile (0.239/km2). There were 273 housing units at an average density of 0.380 per square mile (0.147/km2). The racial makeup of the county was 96.40% White, 0.23% Native American, 0.68% Asian, 0.23% Pacific Islander, 0.90% from other races, and 1.58% from two or more races. 1.35% of the population were Hispanic or Latino of any race. 50.4% were of German, 13.1% English, 6.2% Irish and 5.7% Swedish ancestry.

There were 185 households, out of which 27.60% had children under the age of 18 living with them, 63.20% were married couples living together, 7.60% had a female householder with no husband present, and 25.40% were non-families. 21.60% of all households were made up of individuals, and 10.80% had someone living alone who was 65 years of age or older.  The average household size was 2.40 and the average family size was 2.80.

The county population contained 23.90% under the age of 18, 5.40% from 18 to 24, 29.50% from 25 to 44, 24.80% from 45 to 64, and 16.40% who were 65 years of age or older. The median age was 40 years. For every 100 females there were 101.80 males. For every 100 females age 18 and over, there were 107.40 males.

The median income for a household in the county was $27,375, and the median income for a family was $31,979. Males had a median income of $21,544 versus $13,125 for females. The per capita income for the county was $15,810. About 7.90% of families and 13.80% of the population were below the poverty line, including 15.10% of those under age 18 and 7.80% of those age 65 or over.

Religion
More than 50% of the county residents are Baptists, making it the northernmost Baptist majority county in the United States.

Politics
Arthur County has voted strongly for Republican presidential candidates since 1936. Each one since 1952 has gotten over 60% of the vote, with the exception of George H. W. Bush in 1992.

Communities

Village
 Arthur (county seat)

Unincorporated communities
 Bucktail
 Calora
 Lena
 Velma

See also
 National Register of Historic Places listings in Arthur County, Nebraska

References

External links
 Arthur County official website

 
Nebraska counties
1913 establishments in Nebraska
Populated places established in 1913